John Philip Taft (born March 8, 1954) is an American former professional ice hockey defenseman. He played 15 games in the National Hockey League with the Detroit Red Wings in the 1978–79 season. The rest of his career, which lasted from 1977 to 1983, was spent in the minor leagues. Internationally Taft played for the American national team at the 1976 Winter Olympics, and the 1973, 1974 and 1975 World Championships.

Personal life
Taft's daughter Jenny is a reporter for Fox Sports 1.

Career statistics

Regular season and playoffs

International

Awards and honors

References

External links

John Taft at hockeydraftcentral.com

1954 births
Living people
Adirondack Red Wings players
American men's ice hockey defensemen
Detroit Red Wings draft picks
Detroit Red Wings players
Ice hockey players at the 1976 Winter Olympics
Ice hockey people from Minneapolis
Kansas City Red Wings players
NCAA men's ice hockey national champions
Olympic ice hockey players of the United States
Phoenix Roadrunners draft picks
Salt Lake Golden Eagles (CHL) players
Wisconsin Badgers men's ice hockey players